Walther Eidlitz (1892 – 1976), also known as Vāmana Dāsa, was an Austrian writer, poet, Indologist and historian of religion.

Eidlitz was born in Vienna. In pursuance of his religious and philosophical interest he left his family in Austria in 1938 and traveled to India. He spent time in an internment camp in India during the Second World War, where he was converted to Hinduism by German bhakta Sadananda Swami. Eidlitz was initiated into Gaudiya Vaishnavism by Bhakti Hridaya Bon Swami. He moved to Sweden in 1946. In 1975 he received an honorary doctoral degree from Lund University. He has written about his spiritual journey in his autobiography, but his main work is Kṛṣṇa-Caitanya, The Hidden Treasure of India: His Life and His Teachings (originally in German Kṛṣṇa-Caitanya, Sein Leben und Seine Lehre). He died in Vaxholm.

Bibliography
In German
Walther Eidlitz Hölderlin: Szenen aus einem Schicksal. — Berlin: Reiß, 1917. — 69 p.
Walther Eidlitz Der goldene Wind. — Berlin: Reiß, 1918. — 79 p.
Walther Eidlitz Der junge Gina. — Berlin: Reiß, 1919. — 140 p.
Walther Eidlitz Die Herbstvögel. — Berlin: Rowohlt, 1921. — 94 p.
Walther Eidlitz Bettina. — Berlin: Wir Verlag, 1922. — 13 p.
Walther Eidlitz Der Berg in der Wüste. — Wien: E. P. Tal & Co, 1923. — 63 p.
Walther Eidlitz Die Laufbahn der jungen Clothilde. — Wien: P. Zsolnay, 1924. — 185 p.
Walther Eidlitz Die Gewaltigen: Novellen aus drei Jahrtausenden. — Wien: P. Zsolnay, 1926. — 203 p.
Walther Eidlitz Kampf im Zwielicht: Eine Dichtung. — Wien: P. Zsolnay, 1928. — 55 p.
Walther Eidlitz Zodiak. — Wien: P. Zsolnay, 1930. — 384 p.
Walther Eidlitz Das Licht der Welt. — Wien: Zsolnay, 1932. — 271 p.
Walther Eidlitz Reise nach den vier Winden: auf den Spuren der Weltgeschichte. — Braunschweig: Wollermann, 1935. — 216 p.
Walther Eidlitz Der Mantel der großen Mutter: Eine Wanderung durch die nordische Welt. — Braunschweig: Wollermann, 1937. — 141 p.
Walther Eidlitz Bhakta: Eine indische Odyssee. — Hamburg: Claassen, 1951. — 266 p.
Walther Eidlitz Die indische Gottes-Liebe. — Olten: Walter Verlag, 1955. — 340 p.
Walther Eidlitz Die unverhüllte Bhakti. — Stockholm: Almqvist & Wiksell, 1957. — 79 p.
Walther Eidlitz Der Glaube und die heiligen Schriften der Inder. — Olten: Walter Verlag, 1957. — 307 p.
Walther Eidlitz Kṛṣṇa-Caitanya: Sein Leben und Seine Lehre. — Stockholm: Almqvist & Wiksell, 1968. — 561 p. — (Stockholm studies in comparative religion).
Walther Eidlitz Der Sinn des Lebens: der indische Weg zur liebenden Hingabe. — Olten: Walter Verlag, 1974. — 191 p. — 
In English
Walther Eidlitz Unknown India: A pilgrimage into a forgotten world. — 1st ed. — London: Rider, 1952. — 192 p.
Walther Eidlitz Journey to Unknown India. — Mandala Publishing, 1998. — 194 p. — 
Walther Eidlitz Journey to Unknown India. — Mandala Publishing, 2004. — 208 p. — 
Walther Eidlitz Krishna-Caitanya, His Life and His Teachings. —       
Walther Eidlitz The Meaning of Life in the Indian World of Thought — pdf © Kid Samuelsson, 2008      
In Swedish
Walther Eidlitz Vindrosen runt. — Stockholm: Norstedt, 1935. — 234 p.
Walther Eidlitz Den glömda världen: en bok om det okända Indien / övers. av Karin Granstedt. — Stockholm: Norstedt & söner, 1948. — 229 p.
Walther Eidlitz Krishnas leende: En bok om indisk gudshängivenhet / Övers. från det tyska ms. av Elin Lagerkvist; Günther Eidlitz. — Stockholm: Natur & Kultur, 1955. — 216 p.
Walther Eidlitz Indisk mystik. — Stockholm: Bonnier, 1952. — 56 p. — (Studentföreningen Verdandis småskrifter; Nr. 526).
Walther Eidlitz Indisk mystik / Övers. från förf. tyska ms. och från sanskrittexterna av Ann-Mari Henschen. — 2. uppl. — Stockholm: Bonnier, 1956. — 56 p. — (Studentföreningen Verdandis småskrifter; Nr. 526).
Walther Eidlitz Livets mening och mål i indisk tankevärld / Övers. av Sigvard Sjögren. — Stockholm: Aldus/Bonnier, 1972. — 181 p. — (Aldusserien). — 
Walther Eidlitz Den glömda världen: om hinduism och meditation / övers.: Karin Granstedt och Sigvard Sjögren. — Stockholm: Askild & Kärnekull, 1972. — 207 p. — 
Walther Eidlitz Guds lek: om indisk gudsuppenbarelse / Svensk övers.: Sigvard Sjögren. Red.: Günther Eidlitz. — Stockholm: Natur & Kultur, 1976. — 254 p. — (Acta Universitatis Stockholmiensis). — 
Walther Eidlitz Krishnas flöjt: dikter ur den indiska orduppenbarelsen / i urval och övers. från Sanskrit av Walther Eidlitz. — Stockholm: Tiden, 1976. — 71 p. — 
Walther Eidlitz Krishna-Caitanya, Indiens dolda skatt, Hans liv och Hans lära, 2013.  Sthlms Universitet, 1968. — 587 p.

In Russian
 Вальтер Айдлиц Путешествие в неизвестную Индию. — М.: Философская книга, 2001. — 232 с. —

Notes

Gaudiya religious leaders
Converts to Hinduism
German Hindus
20th-century Austrian poets
Austrian male poets
Austrian male dramatists and playwrights
Austrian Indologists
1976 deaths
1892 births
20th-century Austrian dramatists and playwrights
20th-century Austrian male writers